This is a list of the largest cities in Nicaragua by population.

Cities

References 

Nicaragua
Cities by population